Arthur Vollstedt (21 January 1892 – 15 November 1969) was a German speed skater. He competed in two events at the 1928 Winter Olympics.

References

1892 births
1969 deaths
German male speed skaters
Olympic speed skaters of Germany
Speed skaters at the 1928 Winter Olympics
Sportspeople from Hamburg